The olfactory nerve,  also known as the first cranial nerve, cranial nerve I, or simply CN I, is a cranial nerve that contains sensory nerve fibers relating to the sense of smell.

The afferent nerve fibers of the olfactory receptor neurons transmit nerve impulses about odors to the central nervous system (olfaction). Derived from the embryonic nasal placode, the olfactory nerve is somewhat unusual among cranial nerves because it is capable of some regeneration if damaged. The olfactory nerve is sensory in nature and originates on the olfactory mucosa in the upper part of the nasal cavity. From the olfactory mucosa, the nerve (actually many small nerve fascicles) travels up through the cribriform plate of the ethmoid bone to reach the surface of the brain. Here the fascicles enter the olfactory bulb and synapse there; from the bulbs (one on each side) the olfactory information is transmitted into the brain via the olfactory tract. The fascicles of the olfactory nerve are not visible on a cadaver brain because they are severed upon removal.

Structure
The specialized olfactory receptor neurons of the olfactory nerve are located in the olfactory mucosa of the upper parts of the nasal cavity. The olfactory nerves consist of a collection of many sensory nerve fibers that extend from the olfactory epithelium to the olfactory bulb, passing through the many openings of the cribriform plate, a sieve-like structure of the ethmoid bone.

The sense of smell arises from the stimulation of receptors by small molecules in inspired air of varying spatial, chemical, and electrical properties that reach the nasal epithelium in the nasal cavity during inhalation. These stimulants are transduced into electrical activity in the olfactory neurons, which then transmit these impulses to the olfactory bulb and from there they reach the olfactory areas of the brain via the olfactory tract.

The olfactory nerve is the shortest of the twelve cranial nerves and, similar to the optic nerve, does not emanate from the brainstem.

Function
The afferent nerve fibers of the olfactory receptor neurons transmit nerve impulses about odors to the central nervous system, where they are perceived as smell (olfaction).

The olfactory nerve is special visceral afferent (SVA).

Clinical significance

Examination
Damage to this nerve leads to impairment or total loss anosmia of the sense of smell To simply test the function of the olfactory nerve, each nostril is tested with a pungent odor. If the odor is smelled, the olfactory nerve is likely functioning. On the other hand, the nerve is only one of several reasons that could explain if the odor is not smelled. There are olfactory testing packets in which strong odors are embedded into cards and the responses of the patient to each odor can be determined.

Lesions
Lesions to the olfactory nerve can occur because of "blunt trauma", such as coup-contrecoup damage, meningitis, and tumors of the frontal lobe of the brain. These injuries often lead to a reduced ability to taste and smell. Lesions of the olfactory nerve do not lead to a reduced ability to sense pain from the nasal epithelium. This is because pain from the nasal epithelium is not carried to the central nervous system by the olfactory nerve - it is carried to the central nervous system by the trigeminal nerve.

Aging and smell
A decrease in the ability to smell is a normal consequence of human aging, and usually is more pronounced in men than in women. It is often unrecognized in patients except that they may note a decreased ability to taste (much of taste is actually based on reception of food odor). Some of this decrease results from repeated damage to the olfactory nerve receptors due likely to repeated upper respiratory infections. Patients with Alzheimer's disease almost always have an abnormal sense of smell when tested.

Pathway to the brain
Some nanoparticles entering the nose are transported to the brain via olfactory nerve. This can be useful for nasal administration of medications. It can be harmful when the particles are soot or magnetite in air pollution.

In naegleriasis, "brain-eating" amoeba enter through the olfactory mucosa of the nasal tissues and follow the olfactory nerve fibers into the olfactory bulbs and then the brain.

Additional images

See also

Anterior olfactory nucleus
Phantosmia

Notes

External links



Cranial nerves
Olfactory system